On the morning of March 13, 1888, an explosion took place on Ritter Island, a small volcanic island in the Bismarck and Solomon Seas, between New Britain and Umboi Island. This event is the largest volcanic island sector collapse in recent history.

Background 
Ritter Island in the Bismarck Archipelago is an active stratovolcano located off the northeast coast of Papua New Guinea. It is one of the many active volcanoes in Papua New Guinea as a result of subduction of the Solomon Sea Plate beneath the Bismarck Plate along the New Britain Trench. This process has also resulted in earthquakes both on the subduction zone and within the two tectonic plates. A magnitude 8.1 earthquake in Morobe Province, for example, occurred as a result of the ongoing subduction of the two plates. That event triggered a tsunami and caused some damage to the region.

Pre-1888 Ritter Island 
Before the eruption of 1888, the island was described as a steep-sided and almost circular volcanic cone. An eruption in 1700 was described as impressive and was a notable feature to sailors passing through the Dampier Strait. Based on sketches done in the 1830s, the sides of the volcano had an average angle of 45°, with the western flank thought to be steeper as it had perhaps experienced very small landslides. In other illustrations, the slopes were measured at up to 50°, and are likely exaggerations. Earlier signs of activity were recorded in 1699 and 1793, displaying Strombolian-style eruptions while the 1835 and 1848 events were associated with smoking and steaming. The eruptions in 1887 and 1878 are somewhat debated, some sources claiming they had indeed occurred on the island while others suggest otherwise. An account written anonymously stated that ashfall and tremors possibly from Ritter Island were recorded at Finschhafen in February 1887.

Soon after the 1883 eruption of Krakatoa, scientists concluded that Ritter Island would have the same eruptive characteristics as Krakatoa.

Eruption and collapse 
The eruption of Ritter Island resulted in a massive lateral collapse of the volcano, the largest ever recorded in historical times. There were no detected precursor events that led up to this event. About  of material making up the summit of the island, was deposited northwest. Its volume was almost two times greater than that of the 1980 eruption of Mount St. Helens. The only remnants of the volcano above sea level are a crescent-shaped island and a small islet near its southern tip.

Since there were no direct observations and accounts of the collapse, volcanologists could only make presumptions of the collapse sequence. The slide may have come down in one whole piece, or in a few massive blocks. Upon sliding, the block or blocks further broke apart and formed a debris avalanche. The larger blocks of deposit halted while the rest of the avalanche consisting of smaller debris continued on its path, between the islands of Sakar and Umboi.

Based on reports of the tsunami manifesting in one series, the landslide was likely a single, uninterrupted phase, beginning with a lateral spreading event which then accelerated to a violent collapse. The Ritter collapse did not involve a magmatic eruption, as suggested by researchers, rather, they were phreatomagmatic or phreatic eruptions. Its collapse characteristic is similar to that of Mount Bandai that same year. In both events, the landslide tore off the magma conduit thus would have allowed seawater to interact and cause the explosion.

According to locals, the event was devoid of huge explosive activity during the collapse, but the sound of small explosions were heard, along with earthquakes. These eyewitnesses described hearing the explosions and comparing them to shots. The eruption itself was very short, apparently lasting a mere 30 minutes in a single episode. Ashfall from the volcano was also insignificant. These have been associated with phreatic explosions as magma interacted with seawater, therefore it is unlikely that explosions caused the tsunami.

Post-collapse 

A steep, amphitheater-like scar forms the headwall and landslide scarp above the water. The volcano is still active, and minor eruptions took place for the first time since the collapse in 1972.

Tsunami 
At 6:30 am local time, a witness at Finschhafen heard the sound of thunder that was later followed-up by the receding of the sea. The water level at the town was so low, it posed dangers to ships at the harbor. In two minutes, a reef near Madang was exposed some  due to the retreating sea. The tsunami caused some moderate damage to coastal houses, while some canoes were taken out to sea and lost.

On the shores of New Britain, the tsunami killed 13 people in an expedition from Finschhafen. The group consisted of two Germans, four Malays, and 12 Melanesians from the Duke of York Islands which had arrived on March 6 in search of a place to create a coffee plantation. They were situated along the coast, near a cliff when the waves struck. It washed away tents and parts of the forest on the island. The waves had also eroded away parts of the coastline, shaving parts of the forest and exposing the soil. On the evening of the March 15, a German captain visited the site and found it totally devastated. A search party was sent out to rescue the two Germans missing, but found only five Melanesians. They had survived by clutching onto the branches of trees before the tsunami struck. The remaining five survivors that were later rescued measured a maximum wave height of  based on tidemarks left on trees.

It destroyed a yam store and a boat shelter and brought along with it some lumber that was to be used for a bridge. Meanwhile, in Kelana, another village, poorly constructed houses were swept away.

On Umboi Island, many inhabitants along the coasts drowned when the tsunami advanced towards them. Along the northern coast of the island, the tsunami completely wiped out villages. Every village situated along the Dampier Strait was destroyed by the tsunami, but the exact number of casualties is not known, possibly in the hundreds.

In Arica, Chile, four large waves were seen approaching the shore. Ships docked at the port were said to have been smashed by the waves while others capsized.

Tide gauges in Sydney recorded unusual readings not associated with tidal floods on March 15 to 17 that were attributed to the tsunami.

See also 
1741 eruption of Oshima–Ōshima and the Kampo tsunami
1951 eruption of Mount Lamington
1998 Papua New Guinea earthquake
2018 Sunda Strait tsunami
2022 Hunga Tonga–Hunga Ha'apai eruption and tsunami
List of historical tsunamis
List of volcanic eruptions by death toll

References 

1888 disasters in Oceania 
1888 disasters in South America 
1888 in Germany
1888 in Oceania
1888 in Australia
Natural disasters in Papua New Guinea
March 1888 events
Tsunamis in Papua New Guinea
19th-century volcanic events
Phreatic eruptions
Phreatomagmatic eruptions
VEI-3 eruptions
1888 natural disasters
1888 earthquakes
Tsunamis in Chile
Tsunamis in Australia
Megatsunamis
1888 tsunamis
Volcanic tsunamis
19rh-century disasters in Papua New Guinea
1888 in the German colonial empire